Ifeanyi Innocenti Emeghara (born 24 March 1984) is a Nigerian former professional footballer who played as a defender. He was deployed equally on the left and the right flank.

Club career

Partizan
After failing to find a club in Italy, Emeghara arrived to Partizan for a trial in January 2003, accompanied by compatriot Oladipupo Martins. They were both eventually assigned to affiliated club Teleoptik. After spending 18 months with the Optičari, Emeghara was promoted to the Partizan first team in June 2004, penning his first professional contract on a four-year deal. He was given the number 16 shirt, previously worn by fellow countryman Taribo West.

In his first season with the Crno-beli, Emeghara established himself as the team's first-choice left-back, making 39 appearances in all competitions, as Partizan won the league title with an unbeaten record and reached the knockout stage of the UEFA Cup. In January 2006, Emeghara was transferred to Romanian club Politehnica Timișoara on a three-year deal.

Steaua București
In June 2007, Emeghara moved to Steaua București for a reported transfer fee of €1.2 million. His time with the Roș-albaștrii was plagued with injuries, particularly to his knees, causing him to make only 58 competitive appearances over the course of five seasons. In February 2013, after being out of contract for a year, Emeghara signed with Azerbaijani side Gabala.

International career
Emeghara made his international debut for Nigeria on 17 November 2007, playing the full 90 minutes in a 1–0 friendly loss against Australia. He was named in Berti Vogts' 23-man squad for the 2008 Africa Cup of Nations, remaining an unused substitute during the tournament.

Statistics

Honours
Partizan 
First League of Serbia and Montenegro: 2004–05
Steaua București
Cupa României: 2010–11

References

External links
 
 
 
 
 
 

2008 Africa Cup of Nations players
Association football defenders
Azerbaijan Premier League players
Expatriate footballers in Azerbaijan
Expatriate footballers in Romania
Expatriate footballers in Serbia and Montenegro
FC Steaua București players
FC Steaua II București players
First League of Serbia and Montenegro players
FK Partizan players
FK Teleoptik players
Gabala FC players
Liga I players
Liga II players
Nigeria international footballers
Nigerian footballers
Nigerian expatriate footballers
Nigerian expatriate sportspeople in Azerbaijan
Nigerian expatriate sportspeople in Romania
Nigerian expatriate sportspeople in Serbia and Montenegro
Sportspeople from Lagos
1984 births
Living people